The 2007 CIS football season began on August 31, 2007, and concluded with the 43rd Vanier Cup national championship on November 23 at the Rogers Centre in Toronto, Ontario, with the Manitoba Bisons winning their third championship. Twenty-seven universities across Canada competed in CIS football this season, the highest level of amateur play in Canadian football, under the auspices of Canadian Interuniversity Sport (CIS).

Schedule 

2007 marked the first year that the Vanier Cup and Grey Cup were played on the same weekend where they both took place in Toronto's Rogers Centre as part of the 95th Grey Cup celebrations. Dating back to 1973, previous Vanier Cups had always been played the week following the Grey Cup.

Awards and records

Awards 
 Hec Crighton Trophy – Erik Glavic, Saint Mary's
 Presidents' Trophy – Mat Nesbitt, Regina
 Russ Jackson Award – Clovis Langlois-Boucher, Sherbrooke
 J. P. Metras Trophy – Scott Evans, Wilfrid Laurier
 Peter Gorman Trophy – Liam Mahoney, Concordia

All-Canadian team 
 First Team 
Offence
Erik Glavic, QB, Saint Mary's
Jamall Lee, RB, Bishop's
Michael Giffin, RB, Queen's
Mike Bradwell, SB, McMaster
Laurent Lavigne-Masse, SB, Laval
Samuel Giguere, WR, Sherbrooke
Charles-Antoine Sinotte, WR, McGill
Tim O'Neill, C, Calgary
Luc Brodeur-Jourdain, G, Laval
Adam Rogers, G, Acadia
Scott Evans, T, Wilfrid Laurier
Jean-François Morin-Roberge, T, Montreal

Defence
Martin Gagné, DE, Montreal
Justin Cooper, DE, Manitoba
Chris Van Zeyl, DT, McMaster
Simon Patrick, DT, Manitoba
Mat Nesbitt, LB, Regina
Eric Maranda, LB, Laval
Dan Bass, LB, Alberta
Paul Woldu, CB, Saskatchewan
Jean Petit-Frere, CB, Laval
Sammy Okpro, HB, Concordia
David Timmons, HB, Ottawa
Dylan Barker, FS, Saskatchewan

Special Teams
Ara Tchobanian, K, Ottawa
Derek Schiavone, P, Western
Gary Ross, RET, Mount Allison
 Second Team 
Offence
Joshua Sacobie, QB, Ottawa
Anthony Woodson, RB, Calgary
Pierre-Luc Yao, RB, Laval 
Erik Galas, SB, McGill
Rob Bagg, SB, Queen's
Aaron Holba, WR, Alberta
Rob Serviss, WR, McMaster
Kevin Kelly, C, Ottawa
Brendon LaBatte, G, Regina
Frank Spera, G, Ottawa
Simeon Rottier, T, Alberta
Cody Kennedy, T, Queen's

Defence
Daniel Kennedy, DE, Ottawa
Osinachi Ukwuoma, DE, Queen's
Daniel Schutte, DT, Saint Mary's
Sebastien Treault, DT, Ottawa
Mike Sheridan, LB, Ottawa
Tim St. Pierre, LB, Saint Mary's
Anthony Maggiacomo, LB, Wilfrid Laurier
Jeff Zelinski, CB, Saint Mary's
Taurean Allen, CB, Wilfrid Laurier
Brady Browne, HB, Manitoba
Jean-Philip Provencher, HB, Montreal
Elliott Richardson, FS, Acadia

Special Teams
Hugh O'Neill, K, Alberta
Hugh O'Neill, P, Alberta
Duane John, RET, Laval

Results

Regular season standings 
Note: GP = Games Played, W = Wins, L = Losses, PF = Points For, PA = Points Against, Pts = Points

Teams in bold earned playoff berths.

Top 10

Ranks in italics'' are teams not ranked in the top 10 poll but received votes.
NR = Not Ranked, received no votes.

Championships 
The Vanier Cup is played between the champions of the Mitchell Bowl and the Uteck Bowl, the national semi-final games. In 2007, according to the rotating schedule, the winners of the Canada West conference Hardy Trophy meet the Ontario conference's Yates Cup champion for the Mitchell Bowl. The winners of the Dunsmore Cup Quebec championship travel to the Atlantic conference Loney Bowl championship team for the Uteck Bowl.

Vanier Cup

Playoff bracket

Notes 

U Sports football seasons
CIS football season